Anders Olof Wendin (born 16 March 1975, Norrtälje, Sweden) is a Swedish rock musician, best known for his solo project Moneybrother.

Career
After the split-up of his ska-punk band Monster, Wendin took a new direction and released Moneybrother's debut album Blood Panic in 2003. His second album, To Die Alone, was released in 2005. The music of Moneybrother can be described as a soul-oriented blend, incorporating influences from rock, reggae and disco.  In December 2006, Moneybrother released his third album, Pengabrorsan. The title is a literal Swedish translation of Moneybrother, and the album is his first in the Swedish language. It consists of cover versions of English songs, translated into Swedish. August 2007 saw the release of his fourth album Mount Pleasure, which debuted at number one on the Swedish album chart.

In 2017, Wendin participated in the eighth season of the Swedish reality TV-show Så mycket bättre.

Backing band

Current members
Patrick Andersson - guitar
August Berg - drums
Gustav Bendt - saxophone, backing vocals
Henrik Nilsson - bass
Patrik Kolar - organ, piano

Former members
Indy Neidell - organ, piano
Magnus Henriksson - drums, percussion
August Berg - drums
Viktor Brobacke - trombone, backing vocals
Henrik Svensson - guitar

Discography

Albums
Blood Panic (2003)
To Die Alone (2005)
They're Building Walls Around Us (2005)
Pengabrorsan (2006)
Mount Pleasure (2007)
Real Control (2009)
This Is Where Life Is (2012)

EPs
Thunder in My Heart (2002)

Singles
It's Been Hurting All the Way With You, Joanna (2003)
They're Building Walls Around Us (2005)
Blow Him Back Into My Arms (2005)
My Lil Girl's Straight From Heaven (2005)
Dom vet ingenting om oss (2006)
Downtown Train (Tåget som går in till stan) (2007)
Just Another Summer (2007)
Guess Who's Gonna Get Some Tonight (2007)
Down At The R (2007)
Born Under a Bad Sign (2009)

Compilation
Rebell 10 år (2004)

References

External links

 Moneybrother on Myspace

Swedish rock musicians
Living people
1975 births
English-language singers from Sweden
21st-century Swedish singers
MTV Europe Music Award winners